The men's 400 metres hurdles event at the 2006 African Championships in Athletics was held at the Stade Germain Comarmond on August 9–10.

Medalists

Results

Heats

Final

References
Results 

2006 African Championships in Athletics
400 metres hurdles at the African Championships in Athletics